Samantha Anne Bee (born October 25, 1969) is a Canadian and American comedian, writer, producer, political commentator, actress, and television host.

Bee rose to fame as a correspondent on The Daily Show with Jon Stewart, where she became the longest-serving regular correspondent. In 2015, she departed the show after 12 years to start her own show, Full Frontal with Samantha Bee. The show was canceled in 2022 as a "business-based decision" by TBS.

In 2017, Time named her one of the 100 most influential people in the world on their annual Time 100 list.

Early life
Bee was born in Toronto, Ontario, the daughter of Debra and Ronald Bee. She has said of her family: "Dating from well before the turn of the 20th century, if there has ever been a successful, happy marriage in my family lineage, I've yet to hear about it." Bee's parents split up soon after her birth, and she was initially raised by her grandmother, who worked as a secretary at the Catholic school Bee attended, on Roncesvalles Avenue during her childhood. She attended Humberside Collegiate Institute and York Memorial Collegiate Institute.

After graduating from high school, Bee attended McGill University, where she studied humanities. Dissatisfied with a range of issues at the school, she transferred to the University of Ottawa after her first year. At the University of Ottawa, Bee signed up for a theatre class, thinking it would be easy. The class led to Bee discovering her love of performing. Bee later enrolled in the George Brown Theatre School in Toronto.

Career

Career beginnings
Bee started auditioning for acting roles in Toronto while working as a waitress. At age 26, Bee toured with a stage production of Sailor Moon where she played the titular role. Bee performed in Sailor Moons "A" cast and future husband Jason Jones was a member of the "B" cast.

Bee was one of the four founding members of Toronto-based sketch comedy troupe The Atomic Fireballs. The Fireballs were all women. Demonstrating mutual support, the group would try to perform as many of each other's ideas as they could.

2003–2014 at The Daily Show
Bee became a correspondent for The Daily Show with Jon Stewart on July 10, 2003. Bee was the sole female correspondent on The Daily Show from her debut in 2003 until Kristen Schaal joined the show in March 2008. She was The Daily Shows first non-US citizen correspondent. On that program, Bee demonstrated an ability to coax people into caricaturing themselves—particularly in segments like "Kill Drill", on hunters and fossil fuel executives claiming to be environmentalists; "They So Horny?", on the dearth of Asian men in U.S. pornography; "Tropical Repression", on Ed Heeney, a Florida politician running his campaign based on opposition to gay rights; "The Undecided", an over-the-top look at the undecided voters leading up to the 2004 US presidential elections; the "Samantha Bee's So You Want To Bee A..." report series, which humorously caricatured the way in which one can easily obtain a certain job, like becoming a 527 group; and a segment entitled "NILFs" ("News I'd Like to F#@k"), discussing the sexiness of news anchors: "CNN has the wholesome girl-next-door NILFs, the kind you can bring home to meet your mother. MSNBC has the dirty-over-30 NILFs. Fox has the filthy NILFs who will report anything. They're the Hustler of NILFs."

Bee had her first starring role in a feature film in 2004 with the Canadian independent film Ham & Cheese, co-written by her husband Jason Jones and starring Canadian comics Scott Thompson and Dave Foley. The film marked Bee's first starring role. She won a Canadian Comedy Award for "Pretty Funny Female Performance" for her role. Jones joined The Daily Show as a correspondent in 2005, two years after his wife. Jones became a freelance correspondent for the show while Bee reduced her workload during her pregnancy.

In December 2005, on The O'Reilly Factor, Bill O'Reilly used a clip of Bee from The Daily Show as an example of "The War on Christmas", presenting it as having aired recently. The satirical clip featured Bee mentioning how Christmas was the only religious holiday that's also a federal holiday in the United States, with O'Reilly talking about "Secular Central...excuse me, Comedy Central". Jon Stewart responded on his show; inviting Bee out for a discussion, and unlike in the clip that aired on Factor, Bee was visibly eight months pregnant. Bee joked it was obvious that the footage O'Reilly showed was a year old (it originally aired in 2004) because she had different highlights in her hair, before stating that her water had just broken. Bee was recognized with a 2005 Canadian Comedy Award for Best Female TV Performance for her work on The Daily Show.

On January 20, 2008, Bee finished as the highest scoring celebrity in the CBC game show Test The Nation. She had a minor role in Episode 15, "Spy Something or Get Out", of Little Mosque on the Prairie. Bee also appeared in the 12th episode of Season 20 of Law & Order ("Blackmail", episode 445), which aired on January 15, 2010. She played a minor role in an episode of the HBO series Bored to Death. She appeared as herself on the "Madame President" episode of The Electric Company. Bee also did a guest voice role of a talk show hostess named Pam in the Season 2 finale of Bob's Burgers, in addition to providing the voice of Lyla Lolliberry for two episodes in Season 4 of Phineas and Ferb. She appeared on Sesame Street during Season 42 as Mother Goose.
In 2009, Bee appeared in the original cast of Love, Loss, and What I Wore. That same year, she had a small role in the comedy Whatever Works, written and directed by Woody Allen.

Bee authored a book titled I Know I Am, But What Are You?, which was published in 2010. She became the longest-serving regular Daily Show correspondent after passing Stephen Colbert's record in 2011. The same year, Bee collaborated with her longtime friend Allana Harkin on the parenting blog "Eating Over the Sink" for the online magazine Babble. In 2012, she appeared in Ken Finkleman's series Good God as Shandy Sommers, a devoutly Christian cable news host. She has also played roles in the series Bounty Hunters and Game On. In 2014, Bee was a panellist on Canada Reads, the CBC's annual national book debate. She defended Rawi Hage's novel Cockroach. On October 7, 2014, in the absence of Jon Stewart, she co-hosted The Daily Show with Jones.

2015–2022: Full Frontal with Samantha Bee

In March 2015, it was announced that she would leave The Daily Show – after 12 years – to host her own satirical news show on TBS. Bee departed The Daily Show on April 30, 2015. Her new show, Full Frontal with Samantha Bee, debuted on February 8, 2016. With the program's debut, Bee became the first woman to host a late-night satire show. Bee also tried to implement a hiring process which would give her show a more diverse staff than what is typical for a late night comedy show. The first season of Full Frontal generated critical acclaim and in November 2016, the show was renewed for a second season throughout 2017.

Bee is an executive producer of the TBS comedy series The Detour (2016–present), which she created with her husband, Jason Jones. One year into Bee's run on Full Frontal, Time named Bee one of the 100 most influential people in the world. On April 29, 2017, Full Frontal with Samantha Bee hosted "Not the White House Correspondents' Dinner" which aired on TBS the same evening. In July 2017, Bee's "Nasty Woman Shirt" campaign raised over $1 million for Planned Parenthood. In January 2018, TBS renewed Full Frontal for a third and fourth season, set to air through 2020. Bee's deal with Turner runs through 2022.

In an episode of Full Frontal aired on May 30, 2018, Bee called Ivanka Trump a "feckless cunt", after talking about the immigration policy of Donald Trump. The day after the segment aired, Bee apologized and "deeply [regretted]" the comment. Comedians Kathy Griffin, Michelle Wolf, Sarah Silverman, and Jon Stewart defended Bee, with Stewart suggesting much of the outrage over the joke was strategic rather than genuine. The show featured fewer national advertisements the following week. Bee began the episode with an apology to any women she had offended and lamenting that one bad word had overshadowed the policy of detaining illegal immigrant children which she had been criticizing.

In December 2018, it was announced that Bee has launched a new production company, called Swimsuit Competition, as well as signing a first-look deal with TBS. The company will focus on narrative and develop documentary television projects for TBS.

She appeared as Jillian on the revived The Kids in the Hall, released in May 2022.

On July 25, 2022, Bee's representatives announced that TBS had not renewed Full Frontal for a seventh season, and was officially canceled by TBS.

In 2023, Bee was named as the host of the 11th Canadian Screen Awards broadcast on April 16.

Influences
Bee has credited Jon Stewart as one of her major influences, and in several interviews she has said that her other comedic influences include Steve Martin, David Letterman, Mary Tyler Moore, Lucille Ball, Carol Burnett, Betty White, and Joan Rivers.

Personal life
In 2001, Bee married actor and writer Jason Jones, whom she first met in 1996. They reside in Manhattan, New York. In January 2006, she gave birth to her first child, a daughter named Piper, then returned to The Daily Show in March 2006. On January 24, 2008, Bee announced a second pregnancy on air during a bit about the media's coverage of the 2008 presidential campaign. In 2008, their second child, a son named Fletcher, was born. Their third child, a daughter named Ripley, was born in late 2010. During her third pregnancy, Bee joked she and Jones were "just procreating like we're farmers."

Bee holds dual Canadian-American citizenship after being naturalized in 2014.

Filmography

Film

Television

As crew member

Stage

Published works

Awards and nominations

Notes

References

External links

Samantha Bee at Comedy Central

1969 births
21st-century American comedians
21st-century American essayists
21st-century American women writers
21st-century Canadian actresses
21st-century Canadian non-fiction writers
21st-century Canadian women writers
Actresses from Toronto
American feminists
American media critics
21st-century American memoirists
American women memoirists
American satirists
American sketch comedians
American television actresses
Television personalities from New York City
American women television personalities
American television writers
American voice actresses
American women comedians
Canadian emigrants to the United States
Canadian expatriate actresses in the United States
Canadian feminists
Canadian memoirists
Canadian satirists
Canadian sketch comedians
Canadian television actresses
Canadian television personalities
Canadian television producers
Canadian television writers
Canadian voice actresses
Canadian women comedians
Comedians from New York (state)
Comedians from Toronto
Late night television talk show hosts
Living people
McGill University alumni
Naturalized citizens of the United States
Writers from Manhattan
Screenwriters from New York (state)
Television producers from New York City
University of Ottawa alumni
Women satirists
American women television producers
American women television writers
Writers from Toronto
Canadian women television personalities
21st-century American screenwriters
Canadian women memoirists
Canadian Comedy Award winners
Canadian women television writers
Canadian women television producers
George Brown College alumni